Georg Dern (born 9 April 1901, date of death unknown) was a German sports shooter. He competed in the 25 m pistol event at the 1936 Summer Olympics.

References

1901 births
Year of death missing
German male sport shooters
Olympic shooters of Germany
Shooters at the 1936 Summer Olympics
Place of birth missing